Oyster pirate is a name given to persons who engage in the poaching of oysters.  It was a term that became popular on both the West Coast of the United States and the East Coast of the United States during the 19th century.

San Francisco Bay oyster pirates and the works of Jack London 
The term "oyster pirate" appeared in several literary works by Jack London.  London usually used the term without explanation ("I wanted to be where the winds of adventure blew. And the winds of adventure blew the oyster pirate sloops up and down San Francisco Bay"). Writers about London also use the term without explanation ("he was a sailor, seal-hunter, tramp, fish warden, oyster pirate, cannery worker, jailbird, boxer, and gold digger"), as if everyone knew the meaning of the term.

In the context of Jack London's life, it refers to a specific set of conditions peculiar to the oyster industry in San Francisco Bay in the 1880s. While San Francisco Bay had a native oyster (the same species found elsewhere on the Pacific Coast), it was never very abundant. By the early 1850s, entrepreneurs began importing oysters from Shoalwater Bay (now Willapa Bay), Washington Territory. Native West coast oysters were much smaller and had a different flavor from those from the East coast. When the transcontinental railroad was completed, large fishery companies in the east sold juvenile oysters to San Francisco entrepreneurs who purchased submerged land from the State of California and grew oysters from transplanted Eastern stock.

By the 1880s the handful of competing oyster companies began consolidating into a single monopoly.  Their harvest of a private commodity from a public space, the San Francisco Bay, led to an opportunity for oyster pirates. Pirates raided the oyster beds at night and sold their take in the Oakland markets in the morning. The public disliked the Southern Pacific and the oyster growers, and liked cheap oysters. As a result, the oyster pirates had considerable public sympathy and police were reluctant to take action against them.

Jack London described oyster piracy in his autobiographical "alcoholic memoirs", John Barleycorn, in the form of romanticized juvenile fiction in The Cruise of the Dazzler, and from the opposing point of view of the California Fish Patrol in "A Raid on the Oyster Pirates," from Tales of the Fish Patrol. Oyster pirating was also listed as one of London's first occupations, after leaving a cannery at the age of fifteen, by Abraham Rothberg in an Introduction to The Great Adventure Stories of Jack London (1967) and by Eric Hanson in A Book of Ages (2008). London owned a boat which he used as an oyster pirate, whose purchase was funded by a loan from his black nanny Virginia Prentiss.

East Coast and Chesapeake Bay oyster pirates 
Oyster pirates also operated on the east coast of the United States beginning in the 18th century. These disputes often focused on increased privatization of what had been public rights, providing an obvious inspiration for later West Coast activities. Oyster pirates also appeared in the Chesapeake Bay, especially from the second half of the nineteenth century into the twentieth century during the Oyster Wars.

See also 
 Oyster Wars
 San Leandro Oyster Beds

References 

History of fishing
Maritime history of California
Maritime history of Maryland
Maritime history of Virginia
Pirates
Oysters
Poaching